The Wind, in the Evening is a 2004 Italian drama film written and directed by Andrea Adriatico. Loosely inspired by the killing of Marco Biagi, it was screened in the Forum section at the 54th Berlin International Film Festival.

Cast    
Corso Salani as  Paolo
 Francesca Mazza as  Francesca
 Fabio Valletta as  Momo
 Sergio Romano as  Marcucci
 Paolo Porto as  Barista
Giovanni Lindo Ferretti as Darts Player
 Alessandro Fullin as   Italy
Ivano Marescotti as  Marco

See also  
 List of Italian films of 2004

References

External links

 

Italian drama films
2004 drama films
2000s Italian films